Etton may refer to:

Etton, East Riding of Yorkshire, England
Etton, Cambridgeshire, England

John Etton
Thomas Etton
Guy Etton